Samuel Marqus Lloyd "Sam" Vines (born May 31, 1999) is an American professional soccer player who plays as a left-back for Belgian Pro League club Antwerp and the United States national team.

Club career

Colorado Rapids 
Whilst with the Colorado Rapids academy, Vines spent time with United Soccer League side Charlotte Independence during their 2017 season.

On February 23, 2018, Vines signed a homegrown player contract with Colorado Rapids. He was loaned back out to their affiliate Charlotte Independence on March 8, 2018.

In 2019, Vines made 23 starts among 26 MLS appearances for Colorado, playing 90 minutes in 18 of Colorado's last 19 league matches. In 2020, Vines played every minute of every regular season match for Colorado, becoming the only player on the roster to do so. Vines picked up his first career MLS assist on Sep 9 against Houston Dynamo, finding Lalas Abubakar for a stoppage-time equalizer. Vines scored his first career MLS goal on Sep 12 in Colorado's 5–0 win over Real Salt Lake to reclaim the Rocky Mountain Cup. Vines made a substitute appearance in Colorado's MLS Cup Playoffs first-round loss to Minnesota United FC. He finished the season with one goal and three assists.

Antwerp 
In August 2021, Vines headed to Belgium to sign a three-year contract with a one-year option with Royal Antwerp. At the beginning of September, Vines suffered a collarbone fracture in training which required surgery.

International career
Prior to making his full senior international debut, Vines was a regular call-up to the U.S. U-23 MNT. Vines was called up to Jason Kreis' 25-player under-23 camp in Miami in October 2019. Vines made his under-23 debut in a 6–1 win over El Salvador at Florida International University on October 15, coming on for Chris Gloster in the 66th minute. He played 90 minutes in a 1–0 loss to Brazil at the United International Football Festival in the Canary Islands on November 14.

Vines was called-up to the United States national team for the first time on January 2, 2020. Vines made his senior debut, starting in a friendly against Costa Rica on February 1, 2020, becoming the first Colorado Rapids homegrown to start for the United States senior national team side. Vines was called up again for the senior team's December 2020 camp on November 30. Vines played the first half of the a 6–0 friendly win over El Salvador on Dec 9 at Inter Miami CF Stadium in Ft. Lauderdale, Florida.

On January 5, 2021, Vines was named to the joint senior and under-23 January camp in Bradenton, Florida, ahead of Olympic qualifying. Vines played 64 minutes and assisted Jesús Ferreira's first goal in a 7–0 friendly win over Trinidad & Tobago at Exploria Stadium in Orlando on January 31.

Career statistics

Club

International

 As of match played July 11, 2021. United States score listed first, score column indicates score after each Vines goal.

Honors
United States
CONCACAF Gold Cup: 2021

References

External links
 
 

Living people
1999 births
American soccer players
Soccer players from Colorado
Sportspeople from Colorado Springs, Colorado
Association football defenders
Charlotte Independence players
Colorado Rapids players
Royal Antwerp F.C. players
USL Championship players
Major League Soccer players
Belgian Pro League players
United States men's youth international soccer players
United States men's international soccer players
Homegrown Players (MLS)
2021 CONCACAF Gold Cup players
United States men's under-23 international soccer players
CONCACAF Gold Cup-winning players
Expatriate footballers in Belgium